This is a list of fossiliferous stratigraphic units in Saskatchewan, Canada.

References

 

Saskatchewan
Geology of Saskatchewan